Balwinder Singh (born 24 September 1965) is an Indian field hockey player. He competed in the men's tournament at the 1988 Summer Olympics.

References

External links
 

1965 births
Living people
Indian male field hockey players
Olympic field hockey players of India
Field hockey players at the 1988 Summer Olympics
Field hockey players from Amritsar
Asian Games medalists in field hockey
Asian Games bronze medalists for India
Medalists at the 1986 Asian Games
Field hockey players at the 1986 Asian Games